In psychology and neuroscience, motor planning is a set of processes related to the preparation of a movement that occurs during the reaction time (the time between the presentation of a stimulus to a person and that person's initiation of a motor response). Colloquially, the term applies to any process involved in the preparation of a movement during the reaction time, including perception-related and action-related processes. For example, the identification of a task-relevant stimulus is captured by the usual meaning of the term, "motor planning", but this identification process is not strictly motor-related. Wong and colleagues (2015) have proposed a narrower definition to include only movement-related processes: "Specification of the movement trajectory for the desired action, a description of how the end-effector will produce such an action, and finally a description of the full set of the joint trajectories or muscle activations required to execute the movement."

History

References

Cognition
Neurology
Neuroanatomy
 
Aging-associated diseases
Ailments of unknown cause
Geriatrics
Cytoskeletal defects
Psychiatric diagnosis